Winter Story 2007 is the fourth release in the Winter Story album series of South Korean boy band Shinhwa. It was released on 5 December 2007 by Good Entertainment and distributed by Vitamin Entertainment. It is the group's first album in 11 months, since the release of Winter Story 2006–2007 in January 2007. It is also named differently compared to the rest of the series, having dropped '2008' suffix.

The album featured three new tracks: "Game", "I’ll Never Let You Go", a Shinhwa’s signature dance song with strong beats and addictive rhythm, and mid-tempo "The Snowy Night" produced by leader Eric.

Track listing
N.B. lead tracks in bold
 "Game"
 "I'll Never Let You Go"
 "눈 오는 날" (The Snowy Night)

Music video
 "눈 오는 날" (The Snowy Night)

Chart performance

Release history

References

Shinhwa albums
2007 compilation albums